Bring Back the Dead is a 2015 Singapore horror film written and directed by Lee Thean-jeen.  It stars Jesseca Liu as a grieving mother who seeks to return her dead child to life through supernatural means.  It was released theatrically in Singapore on January 8, 2015, and grossed US$284,876.

Plot 
Overcome with grief after the death of her son, Jia En turns to a medium, Madam Seetoh, who promises she can help return the boy's soul.

Cast 
 Jesseca Liu as Jia En
 Jacko Chiang
 Liu Lingling as Madam Seetoh
 Shawn Tan as XiaoLe
 Timothy Law as Tam

Production 
Writer-director Lee was attracted to the original short story, which he adapted, because of its emotional depth.  Lee said casting for the film was difficult, as he had trouble finding an actress in her 30s who was both comfortable with horror and playing a mother.  Liu, who was cast as the mother, said the role was her "most challenging to date", as she had to play a range of emotions without having been a mother.  To prepare for the emotional scenes, she thought about the loss of her cats.  Liu cited a scene in which a disembodied hand fondles her as the most difficult in the film.  After discussing it with Lee, he agreed to make it less intimate, and it was rewritten to involving kissing instead.

Reception 
Boon Chan of The Straits Times rated it 3.5/5 stars and wrote that the story always makes logical sense, avoids cheap scares, and emotionally involves viewers.

References

External links 
 
 
 

2015 films
2015 horror films
Singaporean horror films
2010s Mandarin-language films
Films about the afterlife
2010s supernatural horror films